Bogumił Zygmunt Gacka (born 1955) is a Catholic priest, member of the Marian Fathers and the  Professor of Christian Personalism at the Cardinal Stefan Wyszyński University in Warsaw, Poland.

Biography
Bogumil Gacka received the Doctorate in Systematic Theology from the John Paul II Catholic University of Lublin, Poland, in 1987. The promoter of his doctoral thesis was Professor Czeslaw S. Bartnik.

He was the Vice-rector of the major seminary of the Congregation of the Immaculate Conception of Our Lady (Marian Fathers). His Christian formation of faith is related to the Neocatechumenal Way, he has been walking since 1976.

Publications
 Bibliography of American Personalism, Lublin 1994.
 American Personalism, Lublin 1995.
 Personalism Biannual Journal (editor) - 2001–2006, ISSN 1643-0468.

References

Living people
Polish Roman Catholic theologians
1955 births